Haytham Moussa Faour (born 27 February 1990) is a Lebanese professional footballer who plays as a defensive midfielder for  club Ahed. He is known for his tackling and defensive reading of the game.

Faour joined Ahed in 2009 and became one of the team's main players, winning the Lebanese Golden Ball in 2015. He also captained them to an AFC Cup win in 2019, helping Ahed become the first Lebanese club to win the title. Faour represented Lebanon internationally from 2011 to 2019, playing 58 games and retiring as one of the national team's most-capped players.

Club career
On 2 October 2013, it was reported that Faour had signed for Iraqi club Al-Naft on a loan deal worth $140,000. After playing a friendly game for the club, the manager cancelled the transfer as he stated that he was looking for a "more attacking-minded midfielder".

International career
Faour's debut for the national team came on 17 August 2011, in a 3–2 friendly defeat against Syria at home. In December 2018, he was called up for the 2019 AFC Asian Cup squad. Faour played the first two group stage games, against Qatar and Saudi Arabia. On 24 July 2019, he announced his retirement from international football.

Honours 
Ahed
 AFC Cup: 2019
 Lebanese Premier League: 2009–10, 2010–11, 2014–15, 2016–17, 2017–18, 2018–19, 2021–22
 Lebanese FA Cup: 2017–18, 2018–19
 Lebanese Elite Cup: 2010, 2011, 2013, 2015, 2022; runner-up: 2021
 Lebanese Super Cup: 2011, 2015, 2017, 2018, 2019

Individual
 Lebanese Premier League Best Player: 2014–15
 Lebanese Premier League Team of the Season: 2011–12, 2012–13, 2014–15, 2016–17, 2017–18

See also
 List of Lebanon international footballers

References

External links

 
 Haytham Faour at RSSSF
 
 
 

1990 births
Living people
Lebanese footballers
Lebanon youth international footballers
Lebanon international footballers
Association football midfielders
Al Ahed FC players
Lebanese Premier League players
People from Marjeyoun District
2019 AFC Asian Cup players
AFC Cup winning players